Steel Breeze is the self-titled debut album by the group Steel Breeze released by RCA Records in 1982. "You Don't Want Me Anymore," the first single from the album, entered the Top 20 on the US Billboard Hot 100.

Track listing 
All songs were written by Ken Goorabian, except where noted.

Personnel 
Rick Jacobs – Vocals
Ken Goorabian – Guitar, Vocals
Waylin Carpenter – Lead guitars
Vinnie Pantaleoni – Bass, Vocals
Rod Toner – Keyboards
Barry Lowenthal – Drums

Chart positions
Album - Billboard (United States)

Single - Billboard (United States)

References

1982 debut albums